Solved is the fifth studio album from nerdcore hip hop artist MC Frontalot. It was released on August 23, 2011.

The first single, "Critical Hit", is available for free from the official website. The album's cover art was drawn by Evan Dorkin, with colors by Anthony Clark.

Track listing

References

External links
 Official Solved web page with pre-order info, samples and lyrics

2011 albums
MC Frontalot albums